Erato  (minor planet designation: 62 Erato) is a carbonaceous Themistian asteroid from the outer region of the asteroid belt, approximately  in diameter. The orbital plane is inclined by an angle of 2.22° to the plane of the ecliptic.

Erato is the first asteroid to have been credited with co-discoverers, Oskar Lesser and Wilhelm Forster, who discovered it on 14 September 1860, from the Berlin Observatory. It was their first and only asteroid discovery. The name was chosen by Johann Franz Encke, director of the observatory, and refers to Erato, the Muse of lyric poetry in Greek mythology. It has also been classified as an Eoan asteroid.

References

External links 
 
 

000062
Discoveries by Otto Lesser
Discoveries by Wilhelm Foerster
Named minor planets
000062
000062
18600914